Singhalorthomorpha is a genus of millipedes belonging to the family Paradoxosomatidae.

Species:

Singhalorthomorpha cingalensis 
Singhalorthomorpha serrulata 
Singhalorthomorpha skinneri

References

Paradoxosomatidae